Novoarslanbekovo (Yañı Arıślanbäk) is a rural locality (a village) in Sayranovsky Selsoviet, Tuymazinsky District, Bashkortostan, Russia. The population was 150 as of 2010. There are 2 streets.

Geography 
Novoarslanbekovo is located 49 km southeast of Tuymazy (the district's administrative centre) by road. Staroarslanbekovo is the nearest rural locality.

References 

Rural localities in Tuymazinsky District